Tarbert (from an Old Irish term meaning "draw-boat", i.e. portage) is a town in the north of County Kerry, with woodland to the south and the Shannon estuary to the north. It lies on the N69 coast road that runs along the estuary from Limerick before turning inland at Tarbert towards Listowel, and has two schools Tarbert Primary and Tarbert Comprehensive.

Tarbert Island
The nearby island is linked to the mainland by a short isthmus – the site of the boat portage that gave its name to both the island and the town. There is a car ferry service from the island to the town of Killimer, near Kilrush in Clare. This service, operated by Shannon Ferries, provides a link between the N69 in Kerry and the N67 in Clare.

Also on the island is a small lighthouse and an electricity plant with four oil-fired turbines and a capacity of 640MW. This plant, opened in 1969, was the site of an explosion in 2003 that killed two workers and seriously injured another. The plant was due to be de-commissioned in 2010, with the loss of 130 jobs. However, the plant was purchased by Spanish power company Endesa in January 2009 securing the jobs for up to 75% of the staff and the remaining 25% will be redeployed within the ESB. The new owners planned to convert the plant to gas turbines by 2012, which did eventually not happen.

Population

Tarbert Bridewell
The Tarbert Bridewell is a former courthouse and prison situated in the village. Built in 1831, it was used for trying local court cases and for holding prisoners awaiting transfer to the County Jail in Tralee. The jail closed in 1874 but the courthouse continued in use until the 1950s. In 1993 the complex was reopened as a museum and visitor centre.

Tarbert Lighthouse

Tarbert Lighthouse came into operation on 31 March 1834 H.T.L.H Tarbert Island lighthouse is still operational today. This is a harbour light to guide vessels passing up and down the Shannon estuary. The lighthouse is built on a tidal rock on the north side of Tarbert Island and a cast iron bridge connects the lighthouse to the shore.

Fort Shannon
Fort Shannon was a coastal artillery fortress, near Tarbert, built by the Irish Army in 1942 to protect the River Shannon against hostile warships during The Emergency (as World War II was known in Ireland). It was the only such fortress to have been built by the Irish Government since independence. It was reduced to a care and maintenance basis in 1946 and completely abandoned several years later.

Tarbert House 
Tarbert House is a historic country house dating from 1690. It was built by the  Leslie family, and is still owned by them.

See also
 List of towns and villages in Ireland

References

External links
 The Tarbert Community Website
 Tarbert Bridewell

Towns and villages in County Kerry